The 2016 Team Bath netball season saw Team Bath finish third overall in the 2016 Netball Superleague. In the third-place play-off they defeated Hertfordshire Mavericks 49–48 to finish the season as bronze medallists. During the regular season they finished fourth, level on points with Surrey Storm and Hertfordshire Mavericks in second and third place respectively. Manchester Thunder topped the table. Team Bath lost 53–46 at Manchester Thunder in the play-off semi-finals.

Squad

Preseason
Team Bath's Tri-Tournament
Team Bath hosted and won a Pre-season Tri-Tournament, winning against both Hertfordshire Mavericks and Surrey Storm.

Mike Greenwood Trophy
Team Bath won the Mike Greenwood Trophy, defeating Manchester Thunder 19–14 in the final. In an earlier game against Manchester Thunder they lost 19–17. The tournament featured games with two ten-minute halves.

Regular season

Results

Final table

Playoffs

Semi-final

3rd-place play-off

Team Bath end-of-season awards

See also
 2016 Surrey Storm season

References

2016 Netball Superleague season
2016